William John Alexander McMahon known as Burry McMahon (13 July 1894 – 24 December 1974) was an Irish first-class cricketer.

McMahon was born at Richhill, County Armagh in July 1894. He played three first-class cricket matches for Dublin University, playing all three matches against Northamptonshire. He played once in 1925 at Northampton, and twice in 1926 at Dublin and Northampton. In his three first-class matches, he scored 23 runs and took two wickets. He died at Galway in December 1974.

References

External links

1894 births
1974 deaths
Sportspeople from County Armagh
Cricketers from Northern Ireland
Irish cricketers
Dublin University cricketers